John D. Griggs (born November 5, 1990) is an American football defensive end for the Frisco Fighters of the Indoor Football League (IFL). He played college football for the University of Akron. He went undrafted during the 2013 NFL Draft, and signed as an undrafted free agent with the Jacksonville Jaguars.

Early years
Griggs grew up in Piscataway, New Jersey, where he graduated in 2008 from Piscataway Township High School, and played for the basketball and football team.

College career

Nassau
Griggs enrolled at Nassau Community College, where he played football in 2010.

Akron
Griggs enrolled in the University of Akron, where he played for the Akron Zips football team from 2011 to 2012.

Professional career

Jacksonville Jaguars
After going undrafted during the 2013 NFL Draft, Griggs signed with the Jacksonville Jaguars as an undrafted free agent. He was released on August 25, 2013.

Winnipeg Blue Bombers
Griggs signed with the Winnipeg Blue Bombers of the Canadian Football League in 2013.

Colorado Crush
Griggs played in 9 games with the Colorado Crush during the 2016 season.

Spokane Empire
On February 9, 2017, Griggs signed with the Spokane Empire. Griggs was named First-team All-Indoor Football League in 2017. Led the IFL in sacks in 2017.

Massachusetts Pirates
Griggs signed with the Massachusetts Pirates of the National Arena League for the 2018 season where he was named 1st-Team All-NAL while recording 8.5 sacks and 1 forced fumble. During the 2019 season, Griggs recorded 9.5 sacks while being named 1st-Team All-NAL for the second consecutive year. The 2020 season was canceled due to COVID-19 and Griggs resigned with the Massachusetts Pirates for the 2021 season. He appeared in 15 games while recording 2.5 sacks.

Frisco Fighters
On December 16, 2021, Griggs signed with the Frisco Fighters of the Indoor Football League (IFL). On October 24, 2022, Griggs was released by the Fighters. On January 13, 2023, Griggs re-signed with the Fighters for the 2023 season.

References

External links
Akron Zips bio

1990 births
Living people
People from Piscataway, New Jersey
Piscataway High School alumni
Players of American football from New Jersey
Sportspeople from Middlesex County, New Jersey
American football defensive ends
Akron Zips football players
Jacksonville Jaguars players
Winnipeg Blue Bombers players
Colorado Crush (IFL) players
Spokane Empire players
Nassau Community College alumni
Massachusetts Pirates players